WHSY (950 AM, "The Legend") is a radio station broadcasting a classic country format. Licensed to Hattiesburg, Mississippi, United States, the station serves the Hattiesburg-Laurel area. The station is currently owned by Timothy D. Lee's Lee Airwaves, LLC, through licensee Sunbelt Broadcasting Corporation.

References

External links

HSY
Classic country radio stations in the United States
Radio stations established in 1954
1954 establishments in Mississippi
Hattiesburg, Mississippi